Wayne Charles Colman  (born April 13, 1946 in Ventnor City, New Jersey) is a former American football linebacker who played nine seasons in the National Football League for the Philadelphia Eagles and New Orleans Saints.  He played college football at Temple University.

A native of Ventnor, Colman played at Atlantic City High School and played in college for the Temple Owls football team.

References

1946 births
American football linebackers
Atlantic City High School alumni
Living people
New Orleans Saints players
People from Ventnor City, New Jersey
Philadelphia Eagles players
Temple Owls football players